In mathematics, a Cayley graph, also known as a Cayley color graph, Cayley diagram, group diagram, or color group is a graph that encodes the abstract structure of a group. Its definition is suggested by Cayley's theorem (named after Arthur Cayley), and uses a specified set of generators for the group. It is a central tool in combinatorial and geometric group theory. The structure and symmetry of Cayley graphs makes them particularly good candidates for constructing families of expander graphs.

Definition 
The Cayley graph  is an edge-colored directed graph constructed as follows:

Not every source requires that  generate the group.

The set  is sometimes assumed to be  symmetric (i.e. ) and not containing the identity element of the group. In this case, the uncolored Cayley graph can be represented as a simple undirected graph.

In geometric group theory, the set  is often assumed to be finite which corresponds to  being locally finite.

Examples 
 Suppose that  is the infinite cyclic group and the set  consists of the standard generator 1 and its inverse (−1 in the additive notation); then the Cayley graph is an infinite path.
More generally, the Cayley graphs of finite cyclic groups are exactly the circulant graphs.
 The Cayley graph of the direct product of groups (with the cartesian product of generating sets as a generating set) is the cartesian product of the corresponding Cayley graphs.  Thus the Cayley graph of the abelian group  with the set of generators consisting of four elements  is the infinite grid on the plane , while for the direct product  with similar generators the Cayley graph is the  finite grid on a torus.

Therefore the graph is mixed: it has eight vertices, eight arrows, and four edges. As both reflections are self-inverse the Cayley graph on the right is completely undirected. This graph corresponds to the presentation 
 The Cayley graph of the free group on two generators  and  corresponding to the set  is depicted at the top of the article, and  represents the identity element. Travelling along an edge to the right represents right multiplication by  while travelling along an edge upward corresponds to the multiplication by   Since the free group has no relations, the Cayley graph has no cycles. This Cayley graph is a 4-regular infinite tree and is a key ingredient in the proof of the Banach–Tarski paradox.

 A Cayley graph of the discrete Heisenberg group   is depicted to the right. The generators used in the picture are the three matrices  given by the three permutations of 1, 0, 0 for the entries . They satisfy the relations , which can also be understood from the picture. This is a non-commutative infinite group, and despite being a three-dimensional space, the Cayley graph has four-dimensional volume growth.

Characterization 
The group  acts on itself by left multiplication (see Cayley's theorem). Explicitly, an element  maps a vertex  to the vertex  The set of edges of the Cayley graph and their color is preserved by this action: the edge  is mapped to the edge , both having color . The left multiplication action of a group on itself is simply transitive, in particular, Cayley graphs are vertex-transitive. The following is a kind of converse to this:

To recover the group  and the generating set  from the unlabeled directed graph  select a vertex  and label it by the identity element of the group.

Elementary properties 

 The Cayley graph  depends in an essential way on the choice of the set  of generators. For example, if the generating set  has  elements then each vertex of the Cayley graph has  incoming and  outgoing directed edges. In the case of a symmetric generating set  with  elements, the Cayley graph is a regular directed graph of degree 
 Cycles (or closed walks) in the Cayley graph indicate relations between the elements of  In the more elaborate construction of the Cayley complex of a group, closed paths corresponding to relations are "filled in" by polygons.
 For any finite Cayley graph, considered as undirected, the vertex connectivity is at least equal to 2/3 of the degree of the graph.  If the generating set is minimal (removal of any element and, if present, its inverse from the generating set leaves a set which is not generating), the vertex connectivity is equal to the degree.  The edge connectivity is in all cases equal to the degree.
If  is an Abelian group, there are exactly  characters, determining all eigenvalues. The corresponding orthonormal basis of eigenvectors is given by  It is interesting to note that this eigenbasis is independent of the generating set .

Schreier coset graph 

If one, instead, takes the vertices to be right cosets of a fixed subgroup  one obtains a related construction, the Schreier coset graph, which is at the basis of coset enumeration or the Todd–Coxeter process.

Connection to group theory 
Knowledge about the structure of the group can be obtained by studying the adjacency matrix of the graph and in particular applying the theorems of spectral graph theory.

The genus of a group is the minimum genus for any Cayley graph of that group.

Geometric group theory 
For infinite groups, the coarse geometry of the Cayley graph is fundamental to geometric group theory. For a finitely generated group, this is independent of choice of finite set of generators, hence an intrinsic property of the group. This is only interesting for infinite groups: every finite group is coarsely equivalent to a point (or the trivial group), since one can choose as finite set of generators the entire group.

Formally, for a given choice of generators, one has the word metric (the natural distance on the Cayley graph), which determines a metric space. The coarse equivalence class of this space is an invariant of the group.

Expansion properties 

When , the Cayley graph  is -regular, so spectral techniques may be used to analyze the expansion properties of the graph.

Representation theory can be used to construct such expanding Cayley graphs, in the form of Kazhdan property (T). The following statement holds: 

For example the group  has property (T) and is generated by elementary matrices and this gives relatively explicit examples of expander graphs.

Integral classification 

An integral graph is one whose eigenvalues are all integers. While the complete classification of integral graphs remains an open problem, the Cayley graphs of certain groups are always integral.

Cayley integral simple group 

It is important that  actually generates the entire group  in order for the Cayley graph to be connected.

:  is a -cycle with eigenvalues 
Therefore  must be a CIS group.

The proof of the complete CIS classification uses the fact that every subgroup and homomorphic image of a CIS group is also a CIS group.

Cayley integral group 

A slightly different notion is that of a Cayley integral group , in which every symmetric subset  produces an integral graph . Note that  no longer has to generate the entire group.

The proof relies on two important properties of Cayley integral groups:
 Subgroups and homomorphic images of Cayley integral groups are also Cayley integral groups.
 A group is Cayley integral iff every connected Cayley graph of the group is also integral.

Normal and Eulerian generating sets 

A 2019 result by Guo, Lytkina, Mazurov, and Revin proves that the Cayley graph  is integral for any Eulerian normal subset , using purely representation theoretic techniques.

The proof of this result is relatively short: given  an Eulerian normal subset, select  pairwise nonconjugate so that  is the union of the conjugacy classes .

(This solved a previously open problem from the Kourovka Notebook.)

History 
Cayley graphs were first considered for finite groups by Arthur Cayley in 1878. Max Dehn in his unpublished lectures on group theory from 1909–10 reintroduced Cayley graphs under the name Gruppenbild (group diagram), which led to the geometric group theory of today. His most important application was the solution of the word problem for the fundamental group of surfaces with genus ≥ 2, which is equivalent to the topological problem of deciding which closed curves on the surface contract to a point.

Bethe lattice 

The Bethe lattice or infinite Cayley tree is the Cayley graph of the free group on  generators. A presentation of a group  by  generators corresponds to a surjective map from the free group on  generators to the group  and at the level of Cayley graphs to a map from the infinite Cayley tree to the Cayley graph. This can also be interpreted (in algebraic topology) as the universal cover of the Cayley graph, which is not in general simply connected.

See also 
 Vertex-transitive graph
 Generating set of a group
 Lovász conjecture
 Cube-connected cycles
 Algebraic graph theory
 Cycle graph (algebra)

Notes

External links 
 Cayley diagrams
 

Group theory
Permutation groups
Graph families
Application-specific graphs
Geometric group theory